San Giacomo Vercellese is a comune (municipality) in the Province of Vercelli in the Italian region Piedmont, located about  northeast of Turin and about  northwest of Vercelli.

San Giacomo Vercellese borders the following municipalities: Arborio, Balocco, Buronzo, Rovasenda, and Villarboit.

References

Cities and towns in Piedmont